Grant Gilmore (8 April 1910 – 1 May 1982) was an American law professor who taught at Yale Law School, the University of Chicago Law School, the College of Law (now Moritz College of Law) at the Ohio State University, and Vermont Law School.  He was a scholar of commercial law and one of the principal drafters of the Uniform Commercial Code. 

Gilmore attended Boston Latin School and then went on to Yale University, where he earned a PhD in Romance languages. Prior to his career in law, he taught French at Yale University.

He authored a number of books on various areas of commercial law, including secured transactions, admiralty law, and contract law, and also drafted Article Nine of the Uniform Commercial Code.  Perhaps his most famous work is his survey and criticism of contract law, The Death of Contract. Gilmore is also known for his quote:Law reflects, but in no sense determines the moral worth of a society…. The better the society, the less law there will be. In Heaven, there will be no law, and the lion will lie down with the lamb…. The worse the society, the more law there will be. In Hell, there will be nothing but law, and due process will be meticulously observed.

Selected publications
Gilmore, Grant.  Security Interests in Personal Property (2 Volumes).  1st edition, Little, Brown & Company, 1965; 2nd edition, The Lawbook Exchange, 1999.  
Gilmore, Grant.  The Death of Contract.  The Ohio State University Press, 1974, 2nd edition 1995, Ronald K.L. Collins, editor:   
Gilmore, Grant & Black, Charles.  The Law of Admiralty.  Foundation Press, 1975. OCLC 1228473.
 (second edition, with new foreword and final chapter by Philip Bobbitt, Yale University Press, 2014. )

References

External links
Article on Gilmore's book Security Interests in Personal Property from Time magazine, 12 January 1968
A reproduction of the announcement of Grant Gilmore's memorial service from the New York Times
Finding aid for Grant Gilmore, Papers Harvard Law School Library

1910 births
1982 deaths
American legal scholars
American legal writers
Boston Latin School alumni
Yale University alumni
Yale Law School faculty
Scholars of contract law
University of Chicago Law School faculty
Yale Sterling Professors
20th-century American non-fiction writers